Pain Ab may refer to:

Pain Ab-e Olya
Pain Ab-e Sofla Sharqi